Carolina Robles Campos (born 4 December 1991) is a Spanish Olympic steeplechaser.

Robles ran the Athletics at the 2020 Summer Olympics – Women's 3000 metres steeplechase where she finished thirteenth in heat three after suffering a fall during the race.

Personal life
She runs an athletics school in Dos Hermanas, Spain. Her partner Daniel Manzanares and her younger sister Carmen Robles have competed in athletics at a national level in Spain.

International competitions

References

External links
 
 
 
 

1991 births
Living people
Spanish female steeplechase runners
Olympic female steeplechase runners
Olympic athletes of Spain
Athletes (track and field) at the 2020 Summer Olympics
Sportspeople from Seville
20th-century Spanish women
21st-century Spanish women